The Cambodian National Baseball Team (CNBT) is the national baseball team of Cambodia. The team represents Cambodia in international competitions.

International tournament results

South East Asian Games

 Champions   Runners up   Third place   Fourth place

History
In 2007, Cambodia made its first national team ever to compete in the international competition in the 24th Southeast Asian Games (SEA Games) held in Bangkok, Thailand on December 7–15, 2007.

Cambodia had lost its opening game to Thailand 16–0 and they had last only 4 and half innings by the IBAF mercy rule. In the second game, Cambodia scored it first runs in history with the Indonesian team, but they also gave up 37 run in a 4 and a half inning game. By the third game, Cambodia played well in 7 strong innings with Philippines and lost 14–0. The fourth game, Cambodia played its first full 9-inning game but lost to Malaysian 11–7. The last game, Cambodia played 7 innings and lost to Myanmar 10–0.

Cambodia gave up total of 88 runs and made 31 errors. They scored only 8 runs with 14 hits in 31 innings with a total of five games. Despite the loss, they made tremendous records and history of their baseball experience.

8th Asian Baseball Cup 2009
 2009 : Rank: 7th Out of 8

On May 25–31, 2009, Cambodia made its second international appearance in the 8th Asian Baseball Cup held in Bangkok, Thailand.

Cambodia opened up its first game against Indonesia, they played a full game and gave up 6 runs to zero. The next day, they lost 10–0 to Hong Kong with just 8 and half innings game. Following the third day, they lost a close game to Myanmar 3–1, a complete game. On May 29, they played with Malaysia. They gave up 4 runs and scored zero in the first inning. Through the fifth inning, they gave up 8 runs. When the game was completed, Cambodia defeated Malaysia 20–8. That was their first win in the international competition in baseball.

2019 Southeast Asian Games

Cambodian National Baseball Team has return to the 30th SEA Game held in Manila, Philippine on December 2–8. Been over 10 years since they competed.

Final result:

Game #1 Cambodia 0 vs Philippine 12

Game #2 Indonesia 8 vs Cambodia 1

Game #3 Thailand 14 vs Cambodia 0

Game #4 Cambodia 1 vs Singapore 9

References 
 PP Post: Cambodia swings first-ever win at Asian Cup, June 5, 2009

National baseball teams in Asia
Baseball